George Everard Kidder Smith (1 October 1913 – 8 October 1997) was an American architect, author, educator, photographer and prolific “builder” of books and curator of exhibitions. 

He collaborated with some of the leading publishers and graphic designers – ranging from Elaine Lustig Cohen and Leo Lionni to Paul Rand – to produce books that were both highly informative and visually engaging. Some publishers include The Museum of Modern Art, Harry N. Abrams, Inc., Edizioni di Comunità and Penguin Books.

Above all, Kidder Smith was an astute observer - in words and pictures - of modern architecture and the historic built environment of numerous cities and countries across the globe. During the 1950s and 1960s, thanks to his activism as a preservationist, he rallied a number of high-profile individuals and eventually helped prevent the Robie House and Villa Savoye from being demolished. In his New York Times obit published on October 26, 1997, Herbert Muschamp described G. E. Kidder Smith as a “civic watchdog.”

Biography 
George Everard Kidder Smith was born in Birmingham, Alabama on October 1, 1913. He was the third of four sons of Francis Hopkinson Smith (1876–1948) and Annie Kidder (1880–1929), a wealthy Episcopalian couple originally from Baltimore. Furthermore, the author, artist and engineer F. Hopkinson Smith (1838-1915) was G. E. Kidder Smith’s great uncle.

From an early age, he was inspired by stirring tales and later than at school he started his deep engagement with architecture and photography.

He graduated from Princeton University, where he obtained a Bachelor of Fine Arts in 1935 and a Master of Fine Arts in 1938. In 1946 he was licensed as an architect.

In August 1942, Kidder Smith married Dorothea Fales Wilder (1916-2015).

During World War II he served in the U.S. Navy with special photographic duties, which gave him the chance to encounter Captain Edward Steichen (1879–1973).

Later on, Kidder Smith and Dot – often accompanied by their two sons (Kidder Jr. and Hopkinson) – travelled the world documenting architecture and the built environment. He was a book author and exhibition curator on architecture in the United States and abroad.

In his early career, Kidder Smith practised architecture and during the years he was visiting lecturer and visiting professor in prestigious institutions such as Yale University School of Architecture and Massachusetts Institute of Technology.

In 1959 Kidder Smith was awarded the AIA Medal for Architectural Photography. His photographs appear in the collection of the Museum of Modern Art.

G. E. Kidder Smith dedicated his life to the understanding and appreciation of architecture—and particularly of modern architecture, and while his multifaceted work received praise from peers throughout his life, he has not received the historical assessment of other contemporary figures such as Julius Shulman and Ezra Stoller.

He passed away at the age of 83, on October 8, 1997, at his home in Manhattan, caused to bronchiectasis.

Books 

 Philip Lippincott Goodwin, Brazil Builds: Architecture New and Old 1652–1942, The Museum of Modern Art, New York, 1943, with photographs by G. E. Kidder Smith;

 Switzerland Builds: Its Native and Modern Architecture, The Architectural Press, London. Albert Bonnier, New York & Stockholm 1950, dust jacket and cover by Paul Rand;

 Sweden Builds: Its Modern Architecture and Land Policy Background, Development and Contribution, The Architectural Press, London. Albert Bonnier, New York & Stockholm 1950, dust jacket and cover by Paul Rand;

 Italy Builds / L’Italia Costruisce: Its Modern Architecture and Native Inheritance / Sua Architettura Moderna e Sua Eredità Indigena, The Architectural Press, London; Reinhold Publishing Corporation, New York; Edizioni di Comunitá, Milan 1955, dust jacket and cover by Leo Lionni, endpapers by Gordon Cullen;

 The New Architecture of Europe / Guida dell’Architettura Contemporanea in Europa / Moderne Architektur in Europa: An Illustrated Guidebook and Appraisal with Photographs of 225 Postwar Buildings of Europe, The World Publishing Company 1961, book layout and cover by Elaine Lustig Cohen;

 The New Churches of Europe / Neuer Kirchenbau in Europa, Holt, Rinehart and Winston, New York, Chicago, San Francisco (North and South America); Architectural Press, London (UK); Verlag Gerd Hatje, Stuttgart (Germany); Edizioni di Comunità, Milano (Italy) 1964, dust jacket and cover by Elaine Lustig Cohen, layout by G. E. Kidder Smith, line drawings by Friedrich St. Florian;

 A Pictorial History of Architecture in America, Vols. 1, 2, American Heritage Publishing, New York 1976, graphic design with Murray Belsky;

 The Architecture of the United States: [Vol. 1] New England and Mid-Atlantic States (An Illustrated Guide to Notable Buildings, Open to the Public); [Vol. 2] The South and Midwest (An Illustrated Guide to Notable Buildings, Open to the Public); [Vol. 3] The Plains States and Far West (An Illustrated Guide to Notable Buildings, Open to the Public), Anchor Press/Doubleday Garden City New York in association with The Museum of Modern Art 1981, dust jacket and covers by Lewis Friedman;

 The Beacon Guide to New England Houses of Worship: An Architectural Companion, Beacon Press, Boston 1989, graphic design by Thomas Fischer, Pam Pokornay, and Richard Pace (cover), Lea Cyr (maps);

 Looking at Architecture, Harry N. Abrams, Inc., New York 1990, graphic design by Bob McKee;

 Source Book of American Architecture: 500 Notable Buildings from the 10th Century to the Present, Princeton Architectural Press, New York 1996, graphic design by Clare Jacobson; Allison Saltzman (cover).

Relevant articles and essays 

 “Alvar Aalto,” The American Scandinavian Review, Winter 1940, 313-320;

 “The Tragedy of American Architecture,” Magazine of Art, Vol. 38, November 1945, 255-260, 278-279;

 “The Navy Builds,” The Architectural Forum, Vol. 84, n. 3, March 1946, 121-136;

 “Manhattan: Some Architectural Pleasures” in New York City and Nearby Attractions, Fodor’s Travel Guide, New York 1983, 70-80.

Exhibitions 

 Stockholm Builds, MoMA, New York, August 4 – September 8, 1941;

 Brazil Builds, MoMA, New York, January 13 – February 28, 1943, for Philip Lippincott Goodwin;

 Power in the Pacific, MoMA, New York, January 23 – March 20, 1945, for Captain Edward Steichen;

 The Postwar Church in Germany, The Goethe House, New York, November 14 – December 14, 1957;

 The Work of Alvar Aalto, The Octagon House, Washington, December 11–29, 1963;

 America's Architectural Heritage, Memphis Chapter AIA, January 14 – February 5, 1978, Memphis, Tennessee;

 Reflection on Church Architecture: A Celebration, The Smithy Pioneer Gallery, New York, July 30 – August 17, 1991.

TV-show and Documentaries 

 An Architectural Odyssey with G. E. Kidder Smith, a documentary produced by WNET. Concept, writing, and production Milton Hoffman. Reviewed by Wolf Von Eckardt, “TV's Monumental Miss,” Washington Post, August 2, 1978, D9.

Unrealised works 

 The Magnificence of Italy (c. 1957– 1961);

 The Architecture of India (c. 1967, c. 1990).

Awards and recognition 

 Citation of the United States Navy Photographic Institute – October 27, 1945;

 Medal for Architectural Photography by the American Institute of Architects – 1963;

 Preservation of Modern Architecture such as Robie House and Villa Savoye.

Fellowships 
In 1946 he was both a Guggenheim Fellow and an American-Scandinavian Fellow, and in 1949 Smith was a President's Fellow at Brown University. He was awarded Fulbright Research fellowships to Italy in 1950 and India in 1965 and a Samuel H. Kress Foundation grant in 1967. In 1967 and 1974 he was the recipient of awards from the National Endowment for the Arts (NEA) and, in the same years, from the Graham Foundation for Advanced Studies in the Fine Arts and in 1970 and 1975 he received Ford Foundation grants.

Lectures 
He gave lectures at numerous architecture schools in the US and Eastern Europe, England, Ireland, India, Italy, Afghanistan, Argentina, and Japan for State Department and Foreign Service. He also taught at Yale (1948-49) and was visiting professor at MIT (1955-56).

Photographs and archives 
G. E. Kidder Smith’s photographs and papers are housed in the following collections:

 Università Iuav di Venezia. Archivio G. E. Kidder Smith, Archivio Progetti, Venice, Italy;

 The Robert Elwall Photographs Collection at the RIBA, British Architectural Library, London, UK;

 The Rotch Library Visual Collections, MIT Libraries, Cambridge, Massachusetts: Kidder Smith Collection of American Architecture;

 Virginia Fine Art Museum, Richmond (VA);

 Getty Image.

Further reading and exhibitions 
 Maggi, Angelo, G. E. Kidder Smith Builds. The Travel of Architectural Photography, with the foreword by Michelangelo Sabatino and a coda by Samuel P. Smith, Oro, Novato (CA) 2022.

 Maggi, Angelo, “George Everard Kidder Smith e la scena urbana europea come esperienza estetica / George Everard Kidder Smith and the European urban scene as an aesthetic experience” in Urbanistica, n. 160, LXIX July – December 2017, 48–58.

 Maggi, Angelo, “Re-interpreting Italy Builds: l’Architettura Italiana secondo George Everard Kidder Smith,” in Maria Antonietta Crippa e Ferdinando Zanzottera (edited by), Fotografia per l’Architettura del XX secolo in Italia. Costruzione della storia, progetto, cantiere, Silvana editoriale, Cinisello Balsamo 2017, 70–83.

 Maggi, Angelo, “Re-interpreting Kidder Smith’s Italy Builds: Crossovers between Photography and Architecture,” in Scopio. International Photography Magazine, vol. 2 (2/3) 2018, 62–77.

 Maggi, Angelo, “The Visual Transmission of European Architecture by George Everard Kidder Smith,” in Inter-fotografia y Arquitectura / Inter-photography and Architecture, Servicio de Publicaciones Universidad de Navarra, Pamplona 2016, vol. 3: interpretaciones / interpretations, 140–151.

 Sabatino, Michelangelo, “G. E. Kidder Smith’s Reputational Shadow”, foreword in Angelo Maggi, G. E. Kidder Smith Builds. The Travel of Architectural Photography, Oro, Novato (CA) 2022, 8–17.

 G. E. Kidder Smith Photographer: Building Books, IIT College of Architecture, Chicago, May 20 – July 8, 2022.

 G. E. Kidder Smith Photographer: At Home in America, Barnsworth Gallery, The Edith Farnsworth House, Plano, Illinois, May 22 – July 31, 2022.

 G. E. Kidder Smith Photographer: Discovering Italy, Italian Cultural Institute in Chicago, Chicago, May 23 – July 8, 2022.

 G. E. Kidder Smith Photographer: The Venice Connection, Università Iuav di Venezia, May 26, 2022.

 Gil, Iker, Interview to Angelo Maggi, Michelangelo Sabatino et al., Chicago, 2022.

References

External links 

 G.E. Kidder Smith Archive, Università Iuav di Venezia, Archivio Progetti

 Robert Elwall Photographs Collection at the RIBA

 The Rotch Library Visual Collections, MIT Libraries 

 G. E. Kidder Smith at MoMA collection

 Applied Research And Design / ORO Editions

 G. E. Kidder Smith Photographer: Building Books at IIT College of Architecture, Chicago

 G. E. Kidder Smith Photographer: At Home in America at The Edith Farnsworth House, Plano, Illinois

 G. E. Kidder Smith Photographer: Discovering Italy at Italian Cultural Institute Chicago

 G. E. Kidder Smith Photographer: The Venice Connection at Università Iuav di Venezia

 “G. E. Kidder Smith Builds” Interview by Iker Gil

1913 births
1997 deaths
American architecture writers
American male non-fiction writers
Architectural photographers
People associated with the Museum of Modern Art (New York City)
20th-century American non-fiction writers
20th-century American male writers
Princeton University alumni
United States Navy personnel of World War II